Luke Madill (born 28 May 1980 in Sydney) is an Australian BMX cyclist who was selected to compete at the 2008 Summer Olympics in Beijing. As preparation for the Olympics, Madill built a replica of the Beijing BMX course on his property at Cranebrook in western Sydney.
Madill often goes by the nickname "Dr Smooth", due to his speed and smoothness in all aspects of racing. Madill attended the primary school Samuel Terry Public School.

References

External links
 
 
 
 
 

1980 births
Living people
Australian male cyclists
BMX riders
Four-cross mountain bikers
Olympic cyclists of Australia
Cyclists at the 2008 Summer Olympics
Cyclists from Sydney